Rossella Olivotto (born ) is an Italian volleyball player, playing as a Middle-blocker. She competed at the 2015 Women's European Volleyball Championship. On club level she plays for VB Casalmaggiore.

References

1991 births
Living people
Italian women's volleyball players
Sportspeople from Trentino
Competitors at the 2018 Mediterranean Games
Mediterranean Games competitors for Italy
21st-century Italian women